Ham is a railway station located in the commune of Muille-Villette near Ham in the Somme department, France.  The station is served by TER Hauts-de-France trains from Amiens to Laon and to Saint-Quentin.

History
Formerly, the station was also connected with secondary metre gauge rail lines:

 to Noyon via Bussy and Guiscard
 to Albert via Péronne
 to Saint-Quentin

Ham was in the combat area during the Battle of the Somme in World War I and suffered heavy damages. The station was destroyed, and a provisional station was built.

See also
List of SNCF stations in Hauts-de-France

References

Railway stations in Somme (department)
Railway stations in France opened in 1867